The Du Toit Nunataks are a group of nunataks between Cornwall Glacier and Glen Glacier, marking the western end of the Read Mountains, Shackleton Range. They were photographed from the air by the U.S. Navy, 1967, and surveyed by the British Antarctic Survey, 1968–71. In association with the names of geologists grouped in this area, they were named by the UK Antarctic Place-Names Committee after Alexander Logie du Toit, a South African geologist.

Features
Geographical features include:

 Hatch Plain
 Poldervaart Edge
 Spath Crest
 Zittel Cliffs

References 

Nunataks of Coats Land